Trevor Laird is an English actor.

Biography
Born in Islington, London.  Laird trained at the Anna Scher Theatre.  Early roles included a 1976 role in a TV adaptation of the Peter Prince novel Playthings, directed by Stephen Frears, and several Play For Todays: Victims of Apartheid by Tom Clarke (1978), Barrie Keeffe's Waterloo Sunset (1979) and The Vanishing Army by Robert Holles (1980). 

Laird was a founder member of the Black Theatre Co-operative (now NitroBeat) in 1978 and performed in its inaugural play Welcome Home Jacko by Mustapha Matura the following year. He then had breakthrough roles in the 1979 film Quadrophenia - as Ferdy, a drug supplier for the main character Jimmy - and in Franco Rosso's 1980 cult classic Babylon as Beefy. He played the boy under the car in The Long Good Friday (1980) and appeared in Menelik Shabazz's black British film Burning an Illusion.

Later appearances include the 1986 Doctor Who serial Mindwarp as the guard commander Frax. He later returned to Doctor Who in the role of Clive Jones, father of the Tenth Doctor's companion Martha Jones.

In 1996 Laird played Hortense's brother in the Mike Leigh film Secrets and Lies. He played Wesley Carter in the TV series Undercover Heart, and Trevor in the British gangster film Love, Honour and Obey (2000). He played   DI Mike Vedder “End of the Night”, S8:E4 of Waking the Dead (2009).

In 2015, Laird appeared as Vince Thuram in the BBC TV series Death in Paradise. In March 2021, he appeared in an episode of the BBC soap opera Doctors as Samuel Asante.

Filmography

References

External links
 

English male television actors
Living people
People from Islington (district)
Black British male actors
Male actors from London
20th-century English male actors
Alumni of the Anna Scher Theatre School
English people of Ghanaian descent
Year of birth missing (living people)